The International Directory of Philosophy is an online database containing information on university philosophy departments, research centers, professional societies, journals, and philosophy publishers in approximately 130 countries. It was established by the Philosophy Documentation Center in 2010 through the consolidation of the Directory of American Philosophers and International Directory of Philosophy and Philosophers. This database is notable as an extensive collection of edited information about continuing philosophical activity world wide. It contains over 37,000 listings.

History 
The Directory of American Philosophers was established in 1963 by Prof. Archie Bahm at the University of New Mexico as a guide to on-going philosophical activity in the US and Canada. It contains edited listings for university and college philosophy programs, research centers, professional societies, philosophical journals, and publishers. It has been published by the Philosophy Documentation Center since 1972 and is now in its 29th edition (2018-2019).

The International Directory of Philosophy and Philosophers was established in 1965 under the auspices of the International Institute of Philosophy with the aid of UNESCO. The founding editors were Gilbert Varet (Centre de Documentation Philosophique - Université de Besançon), and Paul Kurtz (State University of New York at Buffalo). The first edition was also known as the Repertoire international de la philosophie et des philosophes. It has been published by the Philosophy Documentation Center since 1972 and is now in its 21st edition (2019-2020).

The data collection and editorial procedures established for publication of these print directories were adapted by Philosophy Documentation Center to support the production of the online International Directory of Philosophy.

See also
 List of academic databases and search engines

Notes

External links 
 

Bibliographic databases and indexes
Philosophical literature
Philosophical databases